The 2019–20 Minnesota Golden Gophers women's basketball team represent the University of Minnesota during the 2019–20 NCAA Division I women's basketball season. The Golden Gophers, led by second-year head coach Lindsay Whalen, play their home games at Williams Arena as members of the Big Ten Conference.

The Golden Gophers finished the season 16–15 and 5–12 in Big Ten play to finish in eleventh place.  As the eleven seed in the Big Ten tournament, they defeated Penn State in the First Round, before falling to Ohio State in the Second Round.  The NCAA tournament and WNIT were cancelled due to the COVID-19 outbreak.

Offseason

Departures

Arrivals

2019 Recruiting Class

Source:

Roster

Schedule and results

|-
! colspan=9 style=| Non-conference regular season

|-
! colspan=9 style=|Big Ten conference season

|-
! colspan=9 style=|Big Ten Women's Tournament

Source

Rankings

See also
2019–20 Minnesota Golden Gophers men's basketball team

References

Minnesota Golden Gophers women's basketball seasons
Minnesota
Minnesota Golden Gophers women's basketball team
Minnesota Golden Gophers women's basketball team